Szczytniki  is a village in Kalisz County, Greater Poland Voivodeship, in west-central Poland. It is the seat of the gmina (administrative district) called Gmina Szczytniki.

Notable people 
 Tomasz Łubieński, Polish general

References

Villages in Kalisz County
Poznań Voivodeship (1921–1939)